Serhiy Topchiy (born 10 July 2001) is a professional Ukrainian football midfielder who played for FC Lviv.

Career
Topchiy is a product of the different youth sportive school systems from Kharkiv.

In August 2019 Topchiy signed a contract with the Ukrainian Premier League's FC Lviv. He made his debut for FC Lviv as a second half-time substituted player in the losing away match against SC Dnipro-1 on 2 April 2021 in the Ukrainian Premier League.

References

External links
Profile at UAF Official Site (Ukr)

2001 births
Living people
People from Pervomaisk, Mykolaiv Oblast
Ukrainian footballers
Ukrainian Premier League players
FC Lviv players
Association football midfielders
MFA Mukachevo players
Sportspeople from Mykolaiv Oblast